Big Ridge may refer to:

Big Ridge, Missouri, a community
Big Ridge, Nova Scotia, a community
Big Ridge State Park, a state park in Tennessee